Gulliver Nunatak is a nunatak with a flat, ice-free summit,  high, at the north side of Adie Inlet, on the east coast of Graham Land, Antarctica. It was charted by the Falkland Islands Dependencies Survey (FIDS) and photographed from the air by the Ronne Antarctic Research Expedition (RARE) in 1947. It was named by the FIDS for the fictional character in Jonathan Swift's Gulliver's Travels, because when viewed from the southeast its appearance is suggestive of a man lying on his back with his head toward the south.

References

Nunataks of Graham Land
Oscar II Coast